The town of Rota is a Spanish municipality located in the Province of Cádiz, Andalusia. Its surface area is 84 km2 and is bordered by the towns of Chipiona, Sanlúcar de Barrameda and El Puerto de Santa María. It is located near the city of Jerez de la Frontera and is 36 kilometers away from the provincial capital, Cadiz. It had in the year 2009 28,516 inhabitants, with a density of 339 inhabitants / km2. It belongs to two associations, the Association of Municipalities of Cadiz Bay along with the municipalities of Cadiz, Jerez de la Frontera, El Puerto de Santa María, San Fernando, Chiclana and Puerto Real; and the Association of Municipalities of the Lower Guadalquivir that comprises municipalities of Northwest Coast of Andalusia.

Located along the Bay of Cádiz in the Atlantic Ocean, it is halfway between Portugal and Gibraltar, is predominantly a tourist town, a vacation/holiday destination for travelers from all over Europe. During the low season, its main business activity is the fishing industry. In the municipality is located the Naval Station Rota, which is the largest source of employment to the municipality.  It also served as a transoceanic abort landing site for the Space Shuttle program.

History 
Archaeological evidence suggests that there was a Bronze Age settlement on the present site of Rota.  The current town was founded by the Phoenicians at approximately the same time as Cádiz. Rota is assumed to be the same city known as Astaroth of the Tartesian empire. It later passed to the Romans, who knew the town as Speculum Rotae.

Following the arrival of the Moors in Spain, the city became known as Rabita Rutta ("watchtower of Rota"), from which it derives its present name. In 1217 the city was raided by a group of Frisian Crusaders en route to the Holy Land. From 1248 onwards, the Moors were gradually expelled from Spain, and the city became Christian. In 1297, Sancho IV awarded the town to Alonso Pérez de Guzmán in honour of his defence of Tarifa.  Later, Pérez de Guzmán gave it to his daughter, Isabel, as a wedding present when she married Fermin Ponce de León, Maestre of Alcántara and First Lord of Marchena.  Construction of the Castillo de la Luna (Castle of the Moon) had begun in 1295, two years prior to the bequest to Pérez de Guzmán, as part of Sancho IV's effort to develop strong coastal defenses, especially near the entrance to the Mediterranean Sea. During the Middle Ages, the town was an important port for trading with North Africa.  In 1780 the 11th Duke of Arcos died without issue, and the city was rendered to the Duke of Osuna.

Economy 
Rota is primarily a resort town, offering eight hotels and nearly two thousand beds.  It is a summer destination for tourists from all over Europe.  During the off-season, its main commercial activity centres on the fishing industry.

Rota is also the location of the Rota naval base, a joint Spanish and U.S. naval base, opened in 1955 (which also hosts U.S. Marine Corps and U.S. Air Force units). It is also the usual first and last port of call for U.S. naval vessels after leaving the Mediterranean Sea. Once contributing up to 80 percent of Rota's economy directly or indirectly, the significant decrease in the American presence since about 1995, and the city's modern infrastructures that enable those remaining to commute readily from surrounding towns and cities, the base has given way to tourism as the leading source of revenue.

The surrounding area is used for agriculture; the predominant crops are cotton and sunflowers, as well as sweet green peppers, tomatoes, and pumpkins.

Climate

Rota has a hot-summer mediterranean climate (Köppen Csa) with mild winters and hot summers. Rota has significant maritime influences from the Atlantic Ocean. Rota is very sunny, as the annual sunshine hours are above 3,000h. The average sea temperature is around  during the winter and around  during the summer.

Demographics

Culinary 
A traditional dish is the arranque made with chopped bread, tomatoes, green peppers, garlic, salt and olive oil. The local wine, known as tintilla, is made with dark, ripe grapes. It can be found in the numerous bodegas spread over the old town, one of them being El Gato which produces its own wine.

Spanish, Andalucian, Cádiz, and Rota gastronomic delights are many and varied.  Most Spanish people enjoy dishes such as caracoles (snails), menudo (tripe soup), chicharrón (deep fried pork rinds), a variety of wines, and of course gazpacho (cold tomato soup taken as a drink).

Arts 
The Foundation Ruiz Mateos delivers a biannual award called Villa de Rota in the field of the plastic arts, music and literature. This constitutes nowadays an extensive art collection which is being shown in the Museum Ruiz Mateos since opened its doors on 4 February 2005. This museum gathers a total of 102 works composed of oil paintings, watercolors, engravings and sculptures, and includes all first prizes awarded in the course of the national contests “Villa de Rota” as well as individual donations received. Among other artists, Antonio Utrera, Francisco Luque and Dominika Grisgrabed have won the contest.

Politics 
Traditionally the town has four predominant parties: People's Party, Spanish Socialist Workers' Party, United Left, and the local Roteños Unidos (United Rotanians).  While there are occasional independent parties, the only one to successfully enter the Town Council is Roteños Unidos.

Sports 
Rota has two football (soccer) teams: CD Rota and UD Roteña, and also a basketball team: C.D. Don Bosco 88.

See also
 :Category:People from Rota, Andalusia
 Costa de la Luz
 La Rábida Friary
 Naval Station Rota Spain

Notes

External links 

 Rota municipal government, official website 
 VillaDeRota.com (previously ROTAcom° Web Oficial - Rota, Andalusia (Spain) On-line since 1999! News, premiere information, pictures, weather, etc. Into Spanish, English... (https://villaderota.com) 
 Rota.City Tourism website. Find out what's on in Rota City and explore the best routes, shows & events)
 U.S. Naval Station Rota Spain website
 U.S. Naval Hospital Rota Spain website

Costa de la Luz
Municipalities of the Province of Cádiz
Port cities and towns on the Spanish Atlantic coast